KS Łomianki is a Polish football club based in Łomianki, Masovian Voivodeship. The club was founded in 1993. Participant of the 2001–02 Polish Cup.

Polish Cup records

Notable coaches
 Marek Papszun, later vice-champion of Poland with Raków Częstochowa.

Controversies
In August 2013, in the lower league match KS Łomianki versus Polonia Warsaw, hundreds of Legia Warsaw fans turned up and tried to attack the visiting fans, although they only clashed with police. KS Łomianki was later fined for failing to adequately secure the venue and poor organisation was cited.

References

External links
  
 KS Łomianki at 90minut.pl 

Warsaw West County
Football clubs in Poland
Association football clubs established in 1993
1993 establishments in Poland
Football clubs in Masovian Voivodeship